Hrishitaa Bhatt (born 10 May 1981), also spelled as Hrishita Bhat, is an Indian actress and model. She debuted in the film Asoka (2001) opposite Shah Rukh Khan, but it was Haasil (2003) that brought her fame. Bhatt received critical acclaim for the role and appeared in films like Ab Tak Chhappan and Jigyaasa, thereafter. Bhatt was part of the ensemble cast of the ZEE5 cop drama web series, Lalbazaar.

Early life 
Bhatt was born in Mumbai, India. She is an alumna of Trinity College, London, and took Jazz lessons from choreographer Shiamak Davar. She was in the Liril advertisement campaign in 1999 and has also appeared in a music video album, Aankhon Me Tera Hi Chehra by Aryans band with Shahid Kapoor and  Dil- kisipe jab aa jaye by Sonali Vajpayee .

Personal life 
On 4 March 2017, she married Anand Tiwari, a senior diplomat with the United Nations, in a private ceremony in Delhi.

Career

Debut: 2001 - 2002 
Bhatt debuted with the epic historical drama film Asoka (2001) playing the role of Devi, the wife of Mauryan emperor, Ashoka, played by Shah Rukh Khan. She was nominated for the ‘Best Female Debut’ category by Zee Cine Awards and the ‘Most Promising Female Newcomer’ by Screen Weekly Awards.

Her next movie was the multi-starrer Dil Vil Pyar Vyar (2002) where she plays the role of a young and independent woman, Jojo, to Jimmy Shergill's Hrithik Mittal, who wants him to move out of his father's shadow and become independent. Commenting on the role, Rakesh Budhu of Planet Bollywood writes that her "role is small and she continues to show confidence as an actress excellently". The same year, Bhatt starred as a lead with Abhishek Bachchan in the comedy drama film, Shararat. She plays the role of Neha Sengupta who advises community service as a punishment to the errant Rahul, played by Bachchan.

2003 to 2009 
Bhatt was a part of around twenty-five films during this period across various languages - Hindi, Urdu, Bengali, Telugu, and Kannada. Few of the notable films were Haasil (2003), Ab Tak Chhappan (2004), and Charas: A Joint Operation (2004). Playing the role of Niharika in the critically acclaimed film, Haasil, the performance of Bhatt was praised by Kanchana Suggu of Rediff, saying "Bhatt as the coy yet strong, quiet yet confident girl is worth a special mention". Reviewing Ab Tak Chappan, trade analyst Taran Adarsh on Bollywood Hungama says Bhatt doesn't "get ample scope, but leaves a mark nonetheless".

In 2007, she debuted in the Bengali film industry with Jeet and Priyanshu Chatterjee in Bidhaatar Lekha. Her 2007 film, Dharm, by debutant director Bhavna Talwar was an official entry to the 2007 Cannes Film Festival. In 2008, she appeared in IshQ Bector's music video Daaku Daddy with Shakti Kapoor. She had special appearances in the movies Kisna: The Warrior Poet (2005), Page 3 (2006), Heyy Baby (2007), and My Name is Anthony Gonsalves (2008).

2010 to 2014 
There were a handful of releases during this period. Bhatt dabbled in regional films with the 2010 Marathi film, Mani Mangalsutra, and played the role of Sohini in the 2013 popular Bengali movie, Mrs. Sen. The Hindi film releases were Idiots Box (2010), Ammaa Ki Boli (2012) as Pramila, and Anuradha (2014) as Ritu. She had a special appearance in the 2011 action-thriller film by Tigmanshu Dhulia, Shagird.

In 2011, she debuted as a producer with the comic drama film, Shakal Pe Mat Ja. In 2014, she performed a classical dance along with Vidya Malvade on the occasion of Ram Navami, organised by film producer and industrialist Madan Paliwal in Chittorgarh.

2015 to now 
She played the pivotal role of a young village wife, Maya, in the 2015 movie, Miss Tanakpur Haazir Ho. By this time, she also started doing Bengali, Punjabi, and Marathi movies. She was the chief guest at the 2015 India Independence Day festivities at the Federation of Indian Associations-Chicago (FIA). The year saw four more movie releases: Ishq Vich: You Never Know (Punjabi), Dhol Taashe (Marathi), Namaste (Nepali), and Tarfid (Persian).

In 2016, she played the role of a young Bengali widow, Mishti, who is educated and modern, and grieving the loss of her Army husband in the Vivek Agnihotri directorial, Junooniyat, along with Yami Gautam and Pulkit Samrat. Bhatt had a special appearance in the movie, Shorgul, and a lead in the Hindi action drama 30 Minutes, starring Bhatt, Hiten Paintal, Hemant Pandey, and Rana Jung Bahadur. She was part of the Film Preview Committee for the International Film Festival of India (IFFI) 2017.

Her next few movies before debuting on the web series platform in 2020 were the psychological thriller, Ishq Tera (2018), Prakash Electronic (2017), and Happi (2019). She briefly hosted the Rangoli program on DD National between 2018 and 2019.

In 2020, she debuted in the digital space with the cop drama, Lalbazaar, web series on ZEE5 in the role of a journalist, followed by another ZEE5 series, Chargesheet: The Shuttlecock Murder.

With her popularity, she is back on DD National to host the evergreen 'Rangoli' in 2022.

Selected filmography

Web series

References

External links 

1981 births
Living people
Actresses from Mumbai
Indian film actresses
Indian television actresses
Female models from Mumbai
Actresses in Hindi cinema
Actresses in Kannada cinema
Actresses in Telugu cinema
Actresses in Bengali cinema
Actresses in Marathi cinema
Actresses in Urdu cinema
Actresses in Hindi television
Mithibai College alumni
Indian expatriate actresses in Pakistan
21st-century Indian actresses